Muhajir or Mohajir (pl.) is an Arabic word meaning migrant (see immigration and emigration) which is also used in other languages spoken by Muslims, including English. In English, this term and its derivatives may refer in a general sense to individuals or groups, including the following incomplete list:

Most commonly refers to 
Muhajir (Pakistan), Indian Muslims and their descendants who migrated to Pakistan after the Partition of British India in August 1947

Groups 

Muhajirun, the early Muslims (Muhammad and his companions) who migrated from Mecca to Medina in modern-day Saudi Arabia
Muhacir (Turkish variant), Ottoman Muslims who emigrated to Anatolia from the late 18th century until the end of the 20th century
Muhaxhir (Albanians), Ottoman Albanian communities that left their homes as refugees or were transferred because of various wars
 Circassian genocide, Russian: Черкесское мухаджирство (Cherkesskoe muhajirstvo)

Organizations
Al-Muhajiroun, a banned Salafi Islamic jihadist terrorist network that was formerly based in the United Kingdom

Vehicles
Qods Mohajer, Arabic for "sacred migrant"

People 
Al-Muhajir ibn Abi Umayya, early Muslim commander
Muhajir ibn Khalid (died 657), partisan of Caliph Ali
Abu al-Muhajir Dinar (died 683), governor of Ifriqiya (North Africa) under the Umayyad Caliphate
Ismail ibn Abd Allah ibn Abi al-Muhajir, governor of Ifriqiya (North Africa) under the Umayyad Caliphate
Ahmad al-Muhajir (873–956), progenitor of the Sadah Ba 'Alawi group of Hadhrami Sayyid families
Abu Hamza al-Muhajir (1968–2010), leader of Al-Qaeda in Iraq after June 2006
Abdullah al-Muhajir, alias of José Padilla (born 1970), U.S. citizen who was convicted of aiding terrorists in 2007
Abu Sulayman al-Muhajir (born 1984), senior member of al-Qaeda's Al-Nusra Front
Muhadjir Effendy (born 1956), 28th Indonesian Minister of Education and Culture

See also 
Christian emigration
 Exodus (disambiguation)
 Jewish refugees